Mesocochliopidae is an extinct family of fossil sea snails, marine gastropod molluscs in the superfamily Rissooidea.

Genera
Genera within the family Mesocochliopidae include:
Mesocochliopa, the type genus

References 

 The Taxonomicon